Panasonic was a Dutch professional cycling team, sponsored by the Matusishita Corporation, formed in 1984 by team manager Peter Post, when the TI–Raleigh main sponsors, withdrew sponsorship. Some of the riders, followed Jan Raas to his newly formed team, Kwantum Hallen–Decosol. Peter Post retained some riders, and rebuilt his team, with riders, who became one of the most dominant teams, for both classics, and stage races.

The Panasonic team, had a reputation for always having the best equipment, vehicles from Mercedes-Benz, team clothing by Descente 1984-87 / AGU 1988-89 & Biemme 1990–92, team bicycles from Raleigh 1984–85 / Eddy Merckx 1986–87 & Colnago 1988–89, were always fitted with Italian Campagnolo groupsets.

Between 1990–92 the team used Panasonic branded bicycles, fitted with Japanese Shimano equipment, reflecting its corporate branding.

Team riders

Major wins
 Stage 13 of the 1987 Tour de France (Erik Breukink)
 Stage 1A of the Giro d'Italia 1987 (Erik Breukink)
 Tour of the Basque Country 1988 (Erik Breukink)
 Maillot blanc the 1988 Tour de France 1988 (Erik Breukink)
 Stage 14 of the Giro d'Italia 1988 (Erik Breukink)
 Prologue 1989 Tour de France (Erik Breukink)
 Züri-Metzgete 1984 (Phil Anderson)
 Rund um den Henninger Turm 1984 (Phil Anderson)
 Catalan Week 1984 (Phil Anderson)
 Critérium du Dauphiné Libéré 1985 (Phil Anderson)
 Tour de Suisse 1985, 3 stage wins (Phil Anderson)
 Rund um den Henninger Turm 1985 (Phil Anderson)
 E3 Prijs Vlaanderen 1985 (Phil Anderson)
 Paris–Tours 1986 (Phil Anderson)
 Milano–Torino 1987 (Phil Anderson)
 Dwars door Vlaanderen 1984 (Walter Planckaert)
 Tour of Belgium 1984, 3 stage wins (Eddy Planckaert)
 Omloop Het Volk  1984 (Eddy Planckaert)
 3 stage wins Paris–Nice (1984 & 1987) (Eddy Planckaert)
 Étoile de Bessèges  1984 (Eddy Planckaert)
 Omloop Het Volk  1985 (Eddy Planckaert)
 2 stage wins Vuelta a España 1985 (Eddy Planckaert)
 1 stage wins 1985 Tour de France (Eddy Planckaert)
 E3 Prijs Vlaanderen 1987 (Eddy Planckaert)
 2 stages Giro d'Italia 1989 (Jean-Paul van Poppel)
 Veenendaal–Veenendaal 1989 (Jean-Paul van Poppel)

Defunct cycling teams based in the Netherlands
Cycling teams based in the Netherlands
Cycling teams established in 1984
Cycling teams disestablished in 1992